Sewardiella is a genus of liverwort in the family Petalophyllaceae. It contains the single species, Sewardiella tuberifera, which is endemic to India.  Its natural habitat is rocky areas, and it is threatened by habitat loss.

References

Fossombroniales
Flora of West Himalaya
Taxonomy articles created by Polbot
Liverwort genera
Monotypic bryophyte genera